Robert Spano (born 7 May 1961, Conneaut, Ohio) is an American conductor and pianist. He is currently music director of the Fort Worth Symphony Orchestra, music director of the Aspen Music Festival and School, and music director laureate of the Atlanta Symphony Orchestra (ASO).

Biography

Early life
Spano grew up in a musical family in Elkhart, Indiana. His father, Tony Spano, was a flute-builder and instrument-repairman as well as a clarinetist. Spano began making music early, studying piano, flute and violin. By the age of 14, he conducted a composition of his own with the local orchestra.

After graduating from Elkhart Central High School, he studied at the Oberlin Conservatory, where he earned a degree in piano performance, while also pursuing the violin and composition and studying conducting with Robert Baustian. After Oberlin, he studied at the Curtis Institute of Music in Philadelphia, where his mentors included Max Rudolf.

In 1985, Spano left Curtis to take his first professional position, director of orchestral activities at Bowling Green State University.  In 1989, he returned to Oberlin, now as a faculty member, leading the Opera Theater program. He has maintained at least an official affiliation with Oberlin ever since.

Early career
In 1990, Spano was named as an assistant conductor with the Boston Symphony Orchestra.  After leaving this post in 1993, he has been a regular guest conductor with the Boston Symphony and a teacher at the Tanglewood Music Center in the summertime. At Tanglewood, he headed the conductor training program from 1998 to 2002, and directed the Festival of Contemporary Music in 2003 and 2004.  He has made appearances on the Late Show with David Letterman.

In 1995, Spano's first music directorship was announced, with the Brooklyn Philharmonic. He began his tenure in the fall of 1996. Over the next few years, despite multiple financial crises, Spano, the orchestra, and executive director Joseph Horowitz developed programs organized around intellectual, dramatic, or historical themes, with occasional incorporation of visual elements.  In 2002, Spano announced his intention to step down from the Brooklyn post at the end of the 2003–2004 season, remaining as an advisor, and then principal guest conductor, until 2007.

Atlanta
In February 2000, the Atlanta Symphony Orchestra announced the appointment of Spano as its next music director, effective in 2001.  The ASO has reported increased ticket sales and donations during Spano's tenure.  Spano concluded his ASO music directorship at the close of the 2020–2021 season, and now has the title of music director laureate of the ASO.

During his ASO tenure, Spano has developed working relationships with contemporary composers such as Osvaldo Golijov, Jennifer Higdon, Christopher Theofanidis, Michael Gandolfi, and Adam Schoenberg, under the rubric of the "Atlanta School of Composers".  Spano and the ASO have regularly recorded for Telarc, and more recently for Deutsche Grammophon, including compositions from the "Atlanta School of Composers".

Alongside conducting, Spano remains active as a pianist, performing frequently as a chamber musician.  He also continues to compose his own music, though only in his time off from his performing career.  
Spano's work in opera has included conducting Seattle in cycles of Wagner's Der Ring des Nibelungen, in 2005 and in 2009.  He made his guest-conducting debut with the Metropolitan Opera in New York on 19 October 2018, with the United States premiere of Nico Muhly's opera Marnie. including the final performance on 10 November 2018, which was part of the Metropolitan Opera Live in HD series.

Fort Worth
In March 2019, the Fort Worth Symphony Orchestra (FWSO) announced the appointment of Spano as its new principal guest conductor, with immediate effect, with a contract through the 2022–2023 season, simultaneously with his debut as a guest conductor with the orchestra.  In February 2021, the FWSO announced the appointment of Spano as its next music director, effective with the 2022–2023 season, with an initial contract of three years.  He transitioned from principal guest conductor to music director-designate of the FWSO on 1 April 2021.

Awards and honours
Spano was recognized with the Seaver/National Endowment for the Arts Conductors Award in 1994. He has also received honorary degrees from Bowling Green State University and the Curtis Institute of Music, and his recordings have won several Grammy Awards (see below). He was awarded the Ditson Conductor's Award in 2008.  Musical America named Spano as its Conductor of the Year in 2008.

Selected discography
All recordings feature Spano conducting the Atlanta Symphony Orchestra and its Chorus lead by Norman Mackenzie (as appropriate). Additional featured soloists are noted.
 Rimsky-Korsakov: Scheherazade, Op. 35; Russian Easter Overture Telarc CD #80568 (2001). Cecylia Arzewski, solo violin.
Product page / Audio samples. Retrieved 2007-03-25
Vaughan Williams: A Sea Symphony (Symphony #1). Telarc CD #80588 (2002). Christine Goerke, soprano; Brett Polegato, baritone; ASO Chorus
Awards: Grammy Awards for Best Classical Album, Best Choral Performance, and Best Engineered Album, 2003.
Product page / Audio samples. Retrieved 25 March 2007
 Theofanidis: Rainbow Body; Barber: Symphony No.1, Op. 9; Copland: Suite from Appalachian Spring; Higdon: blue cathedral. Telarc CD #80596 (2003).
Product page / Audio samples. Retrieved 25 March 2007
 Higdon: City Scape; Concerto for Orchestra. Telarc CD #80620 (2004).
Product page / Audio samples. Retrieved 25 March 2007
 Berlioz: Requiem, Op. 5 (Grande Messe des Morts). Telarc CD #80627 SACD #60627 (2004). Frank Lopardo, tenor; ASO Chorus.
Awards: Grammy Award for Best Choral Performance, 2005.
Product page / Audio samples. Retrieved 25 March 2007
 Del Tredici: Paul Revere's Ride; Theofanidis: The Here and Now; Bernstein: "Lamentation" from Symphony No. 1 (Jeremiah). Telarc CD #80638 (2005). Hila Plitmann, soprano; Richard Clement, tenor; Brett Polegato, baritone; Nancy Maultsby, mezzo-soprano.
Awards: Gramophone Magazine "Editor's Choice" (December 2005).
Product page / Audio samples. Retrieved 25 March 2007
 Sibelius: Kullervo, Op. 7. Telarc CD #80665 (2006). Charlotte Hellekant, soprano; Nathan Gunn, baritone; Men of the ASO Chorus
Product page / Audio samples. Retrieved 25 March 2007
Golijov: Ainadamar (Fountain of Tears) Deutsche Grammophon CD #477 616-5 (2006). Dawn Upshaw, soprano; Jessica Rivera, soprano; Kelley O'Connor, mezzo-soprano; Ladies of the Atlanta Symphony Orchestra Chorus
Awards: Grammy Awards for Best Opera Recording, Best Classical Contemporary Composition, 2006.
Product page / Audio samples. Retrieved 25 March 2007
Tallis: Why Fum'th in Fight; [[Ralph Vaughan Williams|Vaughan Williams]]: Symphony No. 5/Fantasia on a Theme by Thomas Tallis/Serenade to Music Telarc CD# 80676 (2007) Jessica Rivera, soprano; Kelley O'Connor, mezzo-soprano; Thomas Studebaker, tenor; Nmon Ford, baritone; ASO Chamber Chorus
 Christopher Theofanidis: Symphony No. 1; Peter Lieberson: Neruda Songs; Atlanta Symphony Orchestra; Kelley O’Connor, mezzo-soprano; ASO Media (2011) CD 1002

References

Sources
 Davidson, Justin. "MEASURE FOR MEASURE: Exploring the mysteries of conducting". The New Yorker – 21 August 2006, pp. 60–69. (Conversations with Spano frame an essay on the nature of conducting.)

External links
 Official website of Robert Spano 
 Kirshbaum Associates agency page on Robert Spano
 Artist page at Telarc International. Older bio; list of Telarc cd's; audio samples. Retrieved 24 March 2007

Interviews
Interview with Robert Spano, 26 October 1998
2005 Print Interview with Pierre Ruhe of the Atlanta Journal-Constitution. Spano discusses conducting Wagner's Ring Cycle''. (also cited above) Accessed 24 March 2007

1961 births
20th-century American conductors (music)
20th-century classical pianists
21st-century American conductors (music)
21st-century classical pianists
American classical pianists
Male classical pianists
American male pianists
American male conductors (music)
Aspen Music Festival and School faculty
Bowling Green State University faculty
Curtis Institute of Music alumni
Grammy Award winners
Living people
Music directors
Musicians from Atlanta
Musicians from Boston
Musicians from Colorado
Musicians from Indiana
Oberlin Conservatory of Music alumni
Oberlin College faculty
People from Aspen, Colorado
People from Conneaut, Ohio
Musicians from Brooklyn
People from Elkhart, Indiana
20th-century American pianists
21st-century American pianists
Classical musicians from New York (state)
Classical musicians from Massachusetts
Classical musicians from Ohio
20th-century American male musicians
21st-century American male musicians